The Zimmerman House is a house museum in the North End neighborhood of Manchester, New Hampshire. Built in 1951, it is the first of two houses in New Hampshire designed by Frank Lloyd Wright (the other is the Toufic H. Kalil House, built in 1955 on the same street), and one of a modest number of Wright designs in the northeastern United States. The house was built for Dr. Isadore Zimmerman and his wife Lucille. The house is now owned by the Currier Museum of Art because of the Zimmermans' decision to donate the home to the public after their death. The museum provides tours of the building, which is the only legal access to the grounds. It was listed on the National Register of Historic Places in 1979.

Description and history
The Zimmerman House is located in a residential setting in northern Manchester, New Hampshire. It is a single-story structure, set on a floating concrete slab. It is organized around a large L-shaped central chimney, and covered by a deeply overhanging roof. The rooms are arranged in a single line, except with an open carport at one end. The interior is largely finished in cypress wood.

The house was designed in 1950 by Frank Lloyd Wright in his Usonian style for Dr. Isadore and Lucille Zimmerman. It has two bedrooms, is based on a four-foot module, and is constructed of red glazed brick with Georgia cypress trim (less expensive than tidewater cypress). John Geiger, then an apprentice in Wright's Taliesin Fellowship, was sent to New Hampshire to supervise the construction of the Zimmerman house. He was responsible for the completion of the project and much of its final changes for the clients. Wright redesigned the house around a rock just outside the front entrance. Wright's design extended to include the interior furniture and furnishings. This includes a musical quartet stand, as well as the mailbox. Wright also specified the plantings for the garden.

The property was maintained by the Zimmermans according to Wright's plan, and was donated to the Currier Museum of Art in 1988. The museum offers tours of the property with shuttle service to the house, in order to minimize traffic in the residential neighborhood. No other access to the property is permitted.

See also
National Register of Historic Places listings in Hillsborough County, New Hampshire

References

 Storrer, William Allin. The Frank Lloyd Wright Companion. University Of Chicago Press, 2006,  (S.333)

External links

The Zimmerman House on the Currier Museum Website
The Zimmerman House in the book New Hampshire Architecture by Bryant Franklin Tolles
Zimmerman House - Manchester, NH - Frank Lloyd Wright Designed Buildings on Waymarking.com

Houses on the National Register of Historic Places in New Hampshire
Frank Lloyd Wright buildings
Historic house museums in New Hampshire
Museums in Manchester, New Hampshire
Houses in Manchester, New Hampshire
National Register of Historic Places in Manchester, New Hampshire
Modernist architecture in New Hampshire